The 1982 North Dakota State Bison football team was an American football team that represented North Dakota State University during the 1982 NCAA Division II football season as a member of the North Central Conference. In their fourth year under head coach Don Morton, the team compiled a 12–1 record, finished as NCC champion, and lost to UC Davis in the NCAA Division II Football Championship semifinals.

Schedule

References

North Dakota State
North Dakota State Bison football seasons
North Central Conference football champion seasons
North Dakota State Bison football